Albert Freeman (3 June 1844 – 27 March 1920) was an English cricketer. He played 30 first-class matches for Surrey between 1871 and 1875.

See also
 List of Surrey County Cricket Club players

References

External links
 

1844 births
1920 deaths
English cricketers
Surrey cricketers
Cricketers from Croydon
Sportspeople from Surrey
Surrey Club cricketers